Islamic toys are children's toys directed towards the Muslim community or the Ummah. They can be in the form of dolls, plastic toys, board games. Islamic toys are usually designed to be educational.

Characteristics
They usually carry features that refer to the Muslim value sets.

Recent history
Many toy companies have tried to introducing Islamic toys to the market place these effort where concentrated on dolls and board games. 
Most effort of the toy companies were concentrated on the Middle Eastern region, although successful attempt examples such as Fulla, were successfully introduced to a wide variety of the international market . 

Until recently Fitra toys, a company based in Hong Kong has introduced a diversified range of Islamic toys that combines a story book series and variety of Science DIY toys, wooden toys, and Islamic Art and craft.

See also
Razanne
Saghira

References

Islamic culture
Toy culture
Toy industry